Chicago News is the Illinois district Barbershop quartet that won the 1981 SPEBSQSA international competition.

Discography
 Latest Edition CD
 Special Edition LP, cassette (dupe'd in "Latest Edition")
 Have You Heard The News? LP cassette (dropped)
 Most Happy Fellows & Chicago News, cassette

References
 Discography and biography from Primarily A Cappella
 Discography from  Mike Barkley's Monster list
 AIC entry (archived)

American vocal groups
Barbershop quartets
Barbershop Harmony Society